GRIP1 may refer to:

 Nuclear receptor coactivator 2
 GRIP1 (gene)
 Glutamate receptor-interacting protein (GRIP)